Hankelow is a civil parish in Cheshire East, England. It contains six buildings that are recorded in the National Heritage List for England as designated listed buildings.  Of these, two are listed at Grade II*, the middle grade, and the others are at Grade II. Apart from the village of Hankelow, the parish is entirely rural.  The listed buildings consist of a former country house, now in ruins, three farmhouses, a disused bridge, and a former mill now converted into residential use.

Key

Buildings

See also

Listed buildings in Audlem
Listed buildings in Austerson
Listed buildings in Buerton

Listed buildings in Hatherton
Listed buildings in Hunsterson
Listed buildings in Newhall

References
Citations

Sources

 

 

 

Listed buildings in the Borough of Cheshire East
Lists of listed buildings in Cheshire